Paul Albert Baxter (born 22 April 1964 in London Borough of Hackney) is an English former professional footballer who played in the Football League, for Crystal Palace as a defender.

Playing career
Baxter began his career as an apprentice at Tottenham Hotspur and moved to Crystal Palace in September 1981. His one senior appearance for Palace came in the final game of the 1981–82 season in a home 2–1 defeat to Newcastle United and at the end of the following season having played no further games, Baxter moved on to Leytonstone.

References

External links

Sources

1964 births
Living people
Footballers from the London Borough of Hackney
English footballers
Association football defenders
Crystal Palace F.C. players
Redbridge Forest F.C. players
Enfield F.C. players
Dagenham F.C. players
English Football League players
National League (English football) players